Pale Waves are an English rock band from Manchester, formed in 2014. It was founded originally as Creek when lead singer and guitarist Heather Baron-Gracie met drummer Ciara Doran while attending university in Manchester. The other members are guitarist Hugo Silvani and bassist Charlie Wood, completing the lineup. Pale Waves's early work is often described as 80s-inspired indie rock or synth-pop; their second and third albums, however, owe more to the pop-punk genre.

After signing a record deal with Dirty Hit in 2017, Pale Waves released their debut single, "There's a Honey", followed by "Television Romance". In 2018, the band were ranked fifth in the BBC Sound of 2018 poll and won the NME Under the Radar Award at the NME Awards. Pale Waves' debut EP, All the Things I Never Said, was released in February 2018, followed by their debut studio album, My Mind Makes Noises, on 14 September 2018. The band's second album, Who Am I?, was released on 12 February 2021, and peaked at number three on the UK Albums Chart; the record also hit number one on the UK Independent Albums Chart. The band's third album, Unwanted, was released on 12 August 2022.

History

2014–2017: Formation and early career

Pale Waves formed in 2014 when drummer Ciara Doran met Heather Baron-Gracie while attending BIMM Manchester. The two originally named their group "Creek", but they soon changed it to "Pale Waves", basing the name on a painting Baron-Gracie's grandmother had created. Doran and Baron-Gracie initially enlisted second guitarist Ben Bateman and bassist Ryan Marsden to complete the lineup. Later that year both members were asked to leave and departed from the band shortly thereafter, with current bassist Charlie Wood and second guitarist Hugo Silvani replacing them. The band recorded early demos with production team Sugar House that were released in 2015. These tracks caught the attention of XFM radio broadcaster John Kennedy, who referred them to the independent record label Dirty Hit. Pale Waves was subsequently signed to the label in 2017.

The band's first single under Dirty Hit, "There's a Honey", was released on 21 April 2017 to widespread acclaim. On 1 June 2017, the band played a sold-out show at Madison Square Garden supporting The 1975 on their North American tour. The band's second single, "Television Romance", was released on 16 August 2017, with its music video directed by The 1975 lead singer Matty Healy. Healy later appeared on the cover of NME with Baron-Gracie for the 20 October 2017 issue of the magazine. Pale Waves embarked on their first North American headlining tour in November and December 2017, playing 21 shows over four weeks.

The band headlined DIY magazine's Class of 2018 shortlist for its December/January issue. On 7 November 2017, the band released the single "New Year's Eve", followed by "My Obsession" on 13 December 2017.

2018–2019: All the Things I Never Said and My Mind Makes Noises
Baron-Gracie announced on 4 January 2018 via Twitter that the band had started recording their debut album. On 8 January, it was announced that the band had been placed fifth in the BBC Sound of 2018 poll. Speaking to the BBC, Baron-Gracie talked about how the band's debut album is shaping up and its darker tone: "The songs we have out now are very influenced by romance. The album is me talking about a lot of my darker issues. I talk about a lot of things that go on in my mind rather than in my heart". "The Tide", the first song written by the band, was released on 1 February 2018 as the third single from the band's then-upcoming debut extended play (EP), All the Things I Never Said.

Pale Waves won the NME Under the Radar Award at the NME Awards 2018, and performed "There's a Honey" at the ceremony at London's O2 Academy Brixton on 14 February 2018. The band also received a nomination for Best Video for "Television Romance", but lost out to The Big Moon.

Pale Waves' debut EP, All the Things I Never Said, was released digitally on 20 February 2018, followed by a 12-inch vinyl release on 16 March 2018. On 6 April 2018, it was announced that the band had signed to Interscope Records in a joint venture with Dirty Hit to release music in the United States. The third single from the band's debut album, "Kiss", following "There's a Honey" and "Television Romance", was released on 15 May 2018. "Noises" was released as the fourth single on 28 June 2018.

In an interview with NME magazine in early September 2018 the band revealed they are working on a new EP following the debut album. Baron-Gracie discussed how the new EP will lean towards "pop punk and rock'n'roll" and will touch on themes such as politics, acceptance and sexuality. The band's debut album, My Mind Makes Noises, was released on 14 September 2018 and reached number eight on the UK Albums Chart.

2019–2022: Who Am I?

Speaking to NME while at Radio 1's Big Weekend in May 2019, Baron-Gracie updated on the progress of the EP, saying the band "[had] so many songs" and that they would cut the amount to "five or six tracks" with the remainder that "will probably go on the album". However, in September 2019 the band reported they will no longer be doing an EP, rather "diving deep into the second album". On 17 October 2019 the band won the Q Best Breakthrough Act at the Q Awards 2019.

In January 2020 Pale Waves released the song "SkinDeepSkyHighHeartWide" in collaboration with Lawrence Rothman for The Turning official motion picture soundtrack. The band were involved in a road accident in March 2020 on their way to support Halsey in Berlin. The group's tour bus rolled off the road, leaving them trapped in the bus. Minor injuries were sustained in the accident and the tour bus burnt out. Ciara Doran on Instagram described the incident, "We honestly thought we were going to die. The injuries will heal but this will stay with me and everyone involved for forever."

The band's second album, Who Am I?, was announced on 10 November 2020 along with its lead single "Change", which was named as Annie Mac's Hottest Record in the World. With both Baron-Gracie and Doran being members of the LGBTQ+ community, they both aimed for the album to reflect that, with Baron-Gracie stating in an interview with DIY that she wanted to be "a voice for LGBTQ+ people". The album was partially recorded in Los Angeles with Rich Costey though COVID-19 restrictions forced the band to return to the U.K. and finish the remainder of the album remotely. Of making an album during the pandemic, Baron-Gracie confessed that "for me, music and art is for people not to feel so alone and isolated. I want to be that person my fans look up to and find comfort in." Who Am I? was released on 12 February 2021 and reached number 3 on UK Albums Chart.

2022–present: Unwanted

The band's third studio album, Unwanted, was released on 12 August 2022.

Musical style
Pale Waves have been described as indie pop, indie rock, synth-pop, pop-punk, pop rock, dream pop, and pop. The band have cited artists such as The Blue Nile, Prince, The Cranberries, Cocteau Twins, The 1975, Alanis Morissette and Avril Lavigne as influences. Baron-Gracie has stated, "I love a lot of '80s artists like Prince and Madonna. 'Purple Rain' is one of my favorite songs of all time. But I love The Cure. I love songs that give you melodies that you can sing at any time, but within those melodies, there are things that break your heart." In an interview with The Irish Times, Baron-Gracie cited Dolores O'Riordan as her main vocal influence, saying: "I love The Cranberries. They were amazing. I definitely looked up to Dolores O’Riordan. She has one of my favourite voices of all time. She gave off that attitude – she was totally herself. I loved her fashion sense, she was such a cool person".

For their second album, Who Am I?, Baron-Gracie cited country artists The Chicks and Kacey Musgraves as influences, particularly on "the melodic side of [the] record."

Band members

Current members
 Heather Baron-Gracie – lead vocals, rhythm guitar, keyboards 
 Ciara Doran – drums, keyboards, synthesizers, programming 
 Hugo Silvani – lead guitar, keyboards 
 Charlie Wood – bass guitar, keyboards 

Former members
 Ben Bateman – lead guitar 
 Ryan Marsden – bass 

Timeline

Discography

Studio albums

Extended plays

Singles

As featured artist

Promotional singles

Music videos

Awards and nominations

Notes

References

External links
 

2014 establishments in England
British indie pop groups
Dream pop musical groups
English indie rock groups
English synth-pop groups
Interscope Records artists
Musical groups established in 2014
Musical groups from Manchester
LGBT-themed musical groups
Female-fronted musical groups
Musical quartets
Dirty Hit artists